Seth Morgan may refer to:

 Seth Morgan (novelist) (1949–1990), American novelist
 Seth Morgan (politician) (born 1978), former Republican member of the Ohio House of Representatives